Exorides is a genus of broad-nosed weevils in the family Curculionidae, tribe Eustylini, distributed in northern South America.

Taxonomy 
Exorides was described for the first time by Francis P. Pascoe in 1881 (p. 43). A discussion about the genus along with a key to most species was published by Guy A. K. Marshall in 1922. It belongs to the so-called "Compsus genus complex".

Description 
Species of the genus Exorides are easily confused with members of the genus Compsus, as well as with members of the genus Xestogaster.

A "provisional" diagnosis for Exorides is offered by Marshall: 

The scale coverage in Exorides is highly variable, from absent to dense, including iridescent or metallic colorations. Some species are able to produce waxy secretions and filaments, but this is not common across the genus.

Distribution 
Members of the genus Exorides can be found in Colombia, Ecuador, Peru, and Venezuela.

Species list 
The genus contains 29 described species:

 Exorides abruptecostatus Marshall, 1922: 210: Ecuador.
 Exorides bifurcatus Marshall, 1926: 537: Colombia.
 Exorides caudatus Marshall, 1922: 217= Exorides rudeli]] Voss, 1953: 259: Colombia. 
 Exorides corrugatus Marshall, 1922: 218: Venezuela.
 Exorides cylindricus Marshall, 1922: 213: Colombia.
 Exorides equatorius Marshall, 1922: 219: Ecuador, Peru.
 Exorides equicaudatus Marshall, 1922: 207: Ecuador.
 Exorides espeletiae (Kirsch), 1889: 23: Colombia.
 Exorides festivus Marshall, 1952: 325: Venezuela.
 Exorides immadidus Kuschel, 1950: 71: Peru.
 Exorides labyrinthicus (Kirsch), 1889: 22: Colombia.
 Exorides lajoyei (Bovie), 1907: 68: Venezuela.
 Exorides lindingi (Kirsch), 1889: 24: Colombia.
 Exorides marshalli (Bovie), 1908: 44: Colombia.
 Exorides masoni Marshall, 1922: 215: Venezuela.
 Exorides mucronatus (Faust), 1892: 18= Exorides inflatus]] Marshall, 1922: 214: Colombia, Venezuela.
 Exorides obesus Marshall, 1922: 209: Colombia.
 Exorides octocostatus Hustache, 1938: 117: Peru.
 Exorides otiosus Hustache, 1938: 116: Ecuador.
 Exorides pedunculatus Marshall, 1922: 216: Ecuador.
 Exorides praeteritus Marshall, 1922: 206: Ecuador.
 Exorides pyriformis Marshall, 1922: 211: Colombia.
 Exorides quadrivittatus (Kirsch), 1889: 23: Colombia.
 Exorides rugosus (Taschenberg), 1870: 188: Colombia.
 Exorides septemcostatus Marshall, 1922: 212: Colombia, Ecuador.
 Exorides sulcicollis (Kirsch), 1889: 24: Ecuador.
 Exorides wagneri (Harold), 1863: 176 = Exorides carinatus]] Pascoe, 1881: 43: Ecuador.
 Exorides whymperi (Olliff), 1891: 63: Ecuador.
 Exorides willei Kuschel, 1950: 72: Peru.

References 

Entiminae